Events from the year 1956 in Iran.

Incumbents
 Shah: Mohammad Reza Pahlavi 
 Prime Minister: Hossein Ala'

Events

Births

 28 October – Mahmoud Ahmadinejad.

See also
 Years in Iraq
 Years in Afghanistan

References

 
Iran
Years of the 20th century in Iran
1950s in Iran
Iran